Mayo North and West was a parliamentary constituency represented in Dáil Éireann, the lower house of the Irish parliament or Oireachtas from 1921 to 1923. The constituency elected 4 deputies (Teachtaí Dála, commonly known as TDs) to the Dáil, on the system of proportional representation by means of the single transferable vote (PR-STV).

History and boundaries 
Mayo North and West was created under the Government of Ireland Act 1920 as a 4-seat constituency, for the 1921 general election to the House of Commons of Southern Ireland, whose members formed the 2nd Dáil. It covered the northern and western parts of County Mayo.

It succeeded the constituencies of North Mayo and East Mayo which were used to elect the members of the 1st Dáil and earlier UK House of Commons members.

It was abolished under the Electoral Act 1923, when it was replaced by the new Mayo North and Mayo South constituencies. The new constituencies were first used in the 1923 general election for the members of the 4th Dáil.

TDs

Elections

1922 general election 

	
	

|}

1921 general election 

|}

See also 
Dáil constituencies
Politics of the Republic of Ireland
Historic Dáil constituencies
Elections in the Republic of Ireland

References

External links
Oireachtas Members Database

Dáil constituencies in the Republic of Ireland (historic)
Historic constituencies in County Mayo
1921 establishments in Ireland
1923 disestablishments in Ireland
Constituencies established in 1921
Constituencies disestablished in 1923